Comprehensive Reviews in Food Science and Food Safety is an online peer-reviewed scientific journal published by the Institute of Food Technologists (Chicago, Illinois) that was established in 2002. Its main focus is food science and food safety. This includes nutrition, genetics, food microbiology, food chemistry, history, and food engineering.

Editors
Its first editor was David R. Lineback (University of Maryland, College Park), who held the position from 2002 to 2004. From 2004 to 2006, R. Paul Singh (University of California, Davis) served as editor. The journal was edited by Manfred Kroger (Pennsylvania State University) from 2006 to 2018. Mary Ellen Camire (University of Maine, Orono) has been the editor since 2018.

Abstracting and indexing
The journal is indexed and abstracted in the following bibliographic databases:

See also 

 Food safety

References

External links

Publications established in 2002
Food safety
Wiley-Blackwell academic journals
Food science journals
2002 establishments in Illinois
Bimonthly journals